Brinton may refer to:

Places
 Brinton (crater), on Pluto
 Brinton, Michigan, United States
 Brinton, Norfolk, England

People
 Anna Cox Brinton (1887–1969), American classics scholar, Quaker worker
 Crane Brinton, American historian of France and the history of ideas
 Daniel Garrison Brinton, American archaeologist and ethnologist
 Donna M. Brinton, American linguist
 Edward Brinton (1924–2010), oceanographer and biologist
 Ellen Starr Brinton (1886–1954), pacifist, speaker and archivist
 Emma Southwick Brinton (1834–1922), American Civil War nurse, traveller, correspondent
 Henry G. Brinton, American minister and author
 Howard Brinton (1884–1973), Quaker activist
 John Brinton, British Liberal politician
 Laurel J. Brinton, Canadian-American linguist
 Maurice Brinton, writer for libertarian socialist group Solidarity
 Sal Brinton, British Liberal Democrat politician
 Sam Brinton, American nuclear engineer and LGBTQ activist
 Willard C. Brinton (1880–1957), American engineer, and information visualisation pioneer